Interloop Limited is a textile based B2B manufacturing company based in Faisalabad, Pakistan. It supplies socks and leggings to retailers consisting of Nike, Adidas, H&M, Puma, Levi's, Reebok and Target.

The company has five hosiery manufacturing divisions, located in Pakistan, Bangladesh and Sri Lanka.

History
Interloop was established in 1992 as a B2B manufacturer of socks and leggings by brothers Musadaq Zulqarnain and Navid Fazil along with Tariq Rashid. After eight years, a second production unit was opened with 400 knitting machines installed.

In 2003, Interloop opened its first vertically integrated hosiery plant in Faisalabad in an effort to make its supply chain management more efficient. 
In 2005, the company opened their second hosiery plant, and launched a yarn dying division a year later, also in Faisalabad.

Listing on Pakistan Stock Exchange 
The company was converted into public limited company on July 18, 2008 from being private limited.

In March 2019, Interloop raised more than 5 billion pkr through Pakistan's largest private sector IPO, placing it amongst the top 50 companies listed on the Pakistan Stock Exchange by market capitalization.

Interloop Vision 2025 
On 1 September 2021, the company unveiled its "Vision 2025" plan. Interloop will be adding further capacity by investing in a fully vertical apparel facility and increase the annual capacity to 40 million pieces of apparel. The company is also planning to generate a quarter of its business through value-added services including trends and analytics, design services, collaborative planning, forecasting, warehousing and logistics.

See also
 Textile industry in Pakistan
 Economy of Pakistan
 Foreign trade of Pakistan

References

External links 
 Interloop Limited official website

Multinational companies headquartered in Pakistan
Textile companies of Pakistan
Manufacturing companies established in 1992
Companies based in Faisalabad
Companies listed on the Pakistan Stock Exchange
Pakistani companies established in 1992